The following is the final results of the 1977 World Wrestling Championships. Freestyle competition were held in Lausanne, Switzerland and Greco-Roman competition were held in Gothenburg, Sweden.

Medal table

Team ranking

Medal summary

Men's freestyle

Men's Greco-Roman

References
 FILA Database

World Wrestling Championships
W
World Wrestling Championships, 1977
International wrestling competitions hosted by Sweden
1977 in Swiss sport
1977 in Swedish sport